is the prefectural capital city of Tochigi Prefecture in the northern Kantō region of Japan. Utsunomiya is famous for its gyoza (pan fried dumplings). There are more than two hundred gyoza restaurants in Utsunomiya.

 had a population of 888,005 in the 2000 census. The nearby city of Oyama is included in Greater Tokyo, but Greater Utsunomiya is not, despite the two areas amalgamating somewhat. It is the 10th most populated city in the Kantō region.

Geography
Utsunomiya is located in south-central Tochigi Prefecture in the northern Kantō plains.

Surrounding municipalities
Tochigi Prefecture
 Nikkō
 Kanuma
 Shimotsuke
 Mooka
 Sakura
 Mibu
 Kaminokawa
 Takanezawa
 Shioya

Climate
Utsunomiya has a humid subtropical climate (Köppen climate classification Cfa) with hot and humid summers and cool winters.

Demographics
Per Japanese census data, the population of Utsunomiya has recently plateaued after decades of strong growth.

History
Archaeologists have uncovered evidence that the area of Utsunomiya has been continuously settled since the Japanese Paleolithic period onwards, and numerous burial mounds from the Kofun period are found within its borders. The , which is the Ichinomiya of Shimotsuke Province claims to have been founded in 353 AD. The town of Utsunomiya developed around this shrine, and the area was under the control of the Utsunomiya clan, an offshoot of the Fujiwara clan from the Heian through Sengoku periods, and was destroyed by Toyotomi Hideyoshi.

During the Edo period, the Utsunomiya area was ruled by a succession of daimyō clans under Utsunomiya Domain, and prospered from its location at the junction of the Nikkō Kaidō and the Ōshū Kaidō. During the Bakumatsu period Boshin War, the Battle of Utsunomiya Castle was a major conflict in the northern Kantō area. Following the Meiji restoration, Utsunomiya was briefly (1871–1873) part of Utsunomiya Prefecture, which was then merged into the new Tochigi Prefecture, and became capital of the prefecture in 1884. Utsunomiya became an important garrison for the Imperial Japanese Army.

With the establishment of the municipalities system on April 1, 1889, the town of Utsunomiya was officially established. At the end of the 1889, Utsunomiya had a population of 30,698 making it the third most populous municipality in the Kantō area, after Tokyo and Yokohama.  Utsunomiya was raised to city status on April 1, 1896.  On July 12, 1945 much of Utsunomiya and the surrounding areas were destroyed in the American Bombing of Utsunomiya during World War II.

The city limits were expanded from 1951 to 1955 by annexing neighboring Suzumenomiya town and Hiraishi, Yokokawa, Mizuhono, Kunimoto, Shiroyama, Tomiya, Toyosato, and Sugatagawa villages and the part of Shinoi village from Kawachi District and Kiyohara village from Haga District.  In 1996, Utsunomiya was designated a core city within increased autonomy.  On March 31, 2007, Utsunomiya absorbed the towns of Kamikawachi and Kawachi (both from Kawachi District), pushing the population of Utsunomiya City over 500,000.

Government
Utsunomiya has a mayor-council form of government with a directly elected mayor and a unicameral city legislature of 45 members. Utsunomiya, together with the town of Kamikawa collectively contributes 13 members to the Tochigi Prefectural Assembly. In terms of national politics, the city is divided between the Tochigi 1st district and Tochigi 2nd district of the lower house of the Diet of Japan.

Economy

Utsunomiya is the commercial and industrial center of Tochigi Prefecture. Utsunomiya is home to a Canon optical manufacturing plant, a Japan Tobacco plant, Honda design centers, and various other industrial concerns in the Kiyohara Industrial Park. In addition, one of the largest malls in the north Kantō region, Bell Mall is located near central Utsunomiya.

Education
Utsunomiya University
Sakushin Gakuin University
Bunsei University of Art
Utsunomiya Kyowa University
Utsunomiya Junior College
Utsunomiya Kaisei
Teikyo University Utsunomiya campus
 Utsunomiya has 68 public elementary schools and 25 public  junior high schools operated by the city government as well as one junior high school operated by the prefectural government and one elementary school and one junior high school by the national government. In addition, there is one private elementary school and four private junior high schools. The city has ten public high schools operated by the Tochigi Prefectural Board of Education. There are also five private high schools. In addition, Tochigi Prefecture also operates eight special education schools for the handicapped.

Transportation

Railway
Utsunomiya is served by the high-speed Tohoku Shinkansen line from Tokyo, as well as a number of suburban lines operated by East Japan Railway Company (JR East) and the private railway operator Tobu Railway.

 JR East – Tohoku Shinkansen

 JR East – Tohoku Main Line (Utsunomiya Line/Shōnan-Shinjuku Line/Ueno-Tokyo Line)
 -  Utsunomiya - 
 JR East – Nikkō Line
 -  Utsunomiya
 JR East – Karasuyama Line
 - 
 Tobu Railway - Tobu Utsunomiya Line
 -   -  - 

Construction of a light rail transit system, Utsunomiya Light Rail, connecting Utsunomiya railway station with the neighbouring town of Haga was approved in 2016, with completion scheduled for December 2019.

Highways

Local attractions
site of Utsunomiya Castle
site of Tobuyama Castle
Ōya-ji – a Buddhist temple including a museum with artifacts dating back to the Jōmon Period.
Official Utsunomiya City Tourism Website

Sports
Utsunomiya is represented in the J. League of football with its local club Tochigi SC.
The Utsunomiya Brex are part of Japan's main basketball league, the B.League
Tochigi Green Stadium
Kiyohara Baseball Stadium
Utsunomiya Velodrome - Utsunomiya is the host city of the Japan Cup, a UCI sanctioned cycling race.
1990 UCI Road World Championships took place in Utsunomiya.

Culture

Utsunomiya's famous dumplings

History of Gyoza
Following the Second World War, Japanese soldiers who returned from Manchuria brought home to Utsunomiya gyoza recipes which originated from China. Soon after, the soldiers began to open dumpling (gyoza) restaurants around Utsunomiya. After the Utsunomiya city officials started to realize the popularity of gyoza in 1990, the Utsunomiya Gyoza Association was created. The creation of this association only made gyoza's popularity grow in the city. Utsunomiya gyoza is famous country-wide, so it attracts many tourists, as well as brings in a significant amount of revenue into the city.

Popularity of Gyoza
The city has 30 restaurants that specialize in serving gyoza. Utsunomiya is allegedly the highest consumer city of gyoza in Japan. There is also a  statue in the shape of the gyoza outside of Utsunomiya's JR station.

The Gyoza Festival
Utsunomiya's annual Gyoza Dumplings Festival occurs at the Castle Ruins Park. Visitors are able to taste different types of gyozas served by various gyoza-making restaurants. Festival attendees can also watch various bands and comedians nearby the festival grounds.

Sister cities
 Auckland (then Manukau City), New Zealand, sister city since February 24, 1982
 Tulsa, Oklahoma, United States, sister city since July 10, 1992
 Qiqihar, Heilongjiang, China, Friendship-city since September 30, 1984
 Orléans, Centre-Val de Loire, France, Friendship-city since May 7, 1989
 Pietrasanta, Tuscany, Italy

Notable people

Kozue Ando, professional football player
Minori Chihara, voice actress
Nanae Chrono, manga artist
Yukio Edano, politician
Hajime Funada, politician
Naoya Kondo, professional football player
Ikuo Matsumoto, professional football player
Masako Mori, singer
Toshio Nobe, manga artist
Takuya Nomura, professional wrestler
Sadao Watanabe, jazz musician
Susumu Yanase, politician
Kanako Itō, singer
Naoki Yamamoto, professional racing driver
Lucie, Too, rock band

References

External links

Official Website 

 
Cities in Tochigi Prefecture